Wang Rulin (born April 1953) is a Chinese politician and senior regional official.  He is serving as Vice-Chairperson of the National People's Congress Agriculture and Rural Affairs Committee.  From 2014 to 2016, Wang was the Communist Party Secretary of Shanxi province, where he managed anti-corruption efforts as part of the greater anti-corruption campaign under Xi Jinping. Wang formerly served as Party Secretary (2012–14) and Governor (2009–12) of Jilin province.

Biography

Early life
Wang Rulin was born in 1953 and is recorded as a native of Puyang, Henan province.  During the Cultural Revolution, Wang worked in Fusong County, Jilin performing manual labour as a sent-down youth. He then went on to work for the local forestry production unit. He joined the Chinese Communist Party in November 1973. In 1975, he was recommended to partake in cadre training courses held by the Communist Party, and was then sent to work for the provincial administration of forestry and agriculture. He obtained a bachelor's degree at Jilin Agricultural University.  In August, 1987, he became the provincial head of the Communist Youth League of China.  In 1990, he went to study for a master's degree in economics from Jilin University.

Jilin
Wang Rulin became the mayor of Tonghua in 1993, and the city's party chief in 1994.  In 1998 he was transferred to Yanbian Korean Autonomous Prefecture to be the prefectural party chief.  In 2001 Wang was promoted to executive vice governor of Jilin province, and became the party secretary of the provincial capital Changchun in 2004. In December 2009 he was appointed the acting governor of Jilin, and was officially elected Governor in January 2010.  In December 2012 he was promoted to Communist Party Secretary of Jilin.

In September 2014 he was appointed party chief of Shanxi province, replacing Yuan Chunqing. Governor Bayanqolu succeeded him in his post as party chief of Jilin.

Shanxi and beyond
In Shanxi, Wang was known as an effective enforcer of the party's regulations, and worked to fill posts vacated by officials dismissed as part of a widespread anti-corruption campaign. He won particular praise for the way he had executed the 'clean-up' of the Shanxi political scene. However, the province's economy suffered during his tenure. Official numbers indicated that the province's growth rate in 2015 had slowed to a mere 3.1%, far short of the 9% goal.

In June 2016, it was announced that Wang would be replaced in his leadership position in Shanxi province. The move was unexpected because Wang had not yet reached the typical retirement age for officials of provincial ministerial rank, normally at 65. In addition, having won praise for his anti-corruption efforts in Shanxi, many observers believed Wang was destined for higher office. Wang was replaced by Luo Huining, who possessed a doctorate in economics, ostensibly to re-focus the priority of the province on economic growth.

On July 2, 2016, Wang was appointed as vice chair of the National People's Congress Agriculture and Rural Affairs Committee.

Wang was an alternate member of the 17th Central Committee and is a full member of the 18th Central Committee of the Chinese Communist Party.

References

Living people
1953 births
Governors of Jilin
Chinese Communist Party politicians from Henan
People's Republic of China politicians from Henan
Jilin University alumni
Political office-holders in Shanxi
Alternate members of the 17th Central Committee of the Chinese Communist Party
Members of the 18th Central Committee of the Chinese Communist Party